Standard Bank of South Africa Ltd v Saunderson and Others is an important case in South African property law and civil procedure, heard in the Supreme Court of Appeal (SCA) by Howie P, Cameron JA, Nugent JA, Jafta JA and Mlambo JA on 23 November 2005, with judgment handed down on 15 December.

Facts 
Standard Bank had issued a summons against Saunderson, asking for a judgement on debt owing and ancillary orders declaring the mortgaged property to be executable. Saunderson failed to defend.

The bank sought a default judgment under the Uniform Rules of Court, which provides that,

whenever a defendant is in default of delivery of notice of intention to defend or of a plea, the plaintiff, if he or she wishes to obtain judgment by default, shall file with the Registrar a written application for judgment against the defendant.

The registrar may then "grant judgment as requested."

The matter was dealt with in open court on the direction of the Deputy Judge President. The High Court granted a default judgement, but the execution was declined. The court held that the effect of the registration of a mortgage bond is that the borrower, by his own volition, compromises his rights of ownership until the debt is repaid. The bond curtails the right of property at its root, penetrating the rights of ownership, for the bondholder's rights are fused into the title itself.

Relying on Jaftha v Schoeman, the court held that, since the mortgaged property was residential, the onus was on the bank to show that execution was permissible in terms of the Constitution: There should have been averments to the effect that the facts disclosed were sufficient to justify execution in terms of the right of access to adequate housing. The bank had to show that its applications were a justifiable limitation of that right. Because the summonses lacked such averments, they could not sustain an order of execution.

Judgment 
On appeal to the SCA, it was found that the court a quo had misdirected itself; in particular, that

 "that s 26(1) does not confer a right of access to housing per se but only a right of access to 'adequate' housing," so that the right is "relative;"
 that Jaftha did not find that all residential property was subject to section 26(1);
 that the situation in Jaftha was "radically different" to the present one, as it involved a lack of judicial oversight, resulting in the debtor's being deprived of title to a home because of his failure to pay a "trifling extraneous debt," and as the creditor was not a mortgagee with rights arising from an agreement; and
 that, since most debtors do not defend cases, it is important that they be notified that the execution may infringe on their constitutional right of access to housing.

See also 
 South African property law
 Jaftha v Schoeman

References

Books 
 PJ Badenhorst, JM Pienaar and H Mostert Silberberg and Schoeman's The Law of Property 5 ed (2006).
 H Mostert and A Pope (eds) The Principles of The Law of Property in South Africa 1 ed (2010).

Cases 
 Jaftha v Schoeman and Others 2005 (2) SA 140 (CC).
 Standard Bank of South Africa Ltd v Saunderson and Others 2006 (2) SA 264 (SCA).

Notes 

2006 in South African law
2006 in case law
South African property case law
Supreme Court of Appeal of South Africa cases